Joan Gardner may refer to:

 Joan Gardner (British actress) (1914–1999), British actress
 Joan Gardner (voice actress) (1926–1992), American actress
 Joan Gardner (Broadway actress) (1903–?), Broadway actress and chorus girl
 Joan Gardner (microbiologist) (1918–2013), Australian microbiologist